The SAILS Library Network, formerly Southeastern Automated Integrated Library Services, is a non-profit library consortium of 70 member libraries in 39 communities located throughout Southeastern Massachusetts. SAILS was founded in 1995 to link the ABLE and SEAL library networks, which were later dissolved into SAILS in 2000. The network provides library patrons with access to check out and return items at member libraries, interlibrary loans through the Massachusetts Board of Library Commissioners' Commonwealth Catalog, mobile app access, and access to electronic collections (including OverDrive). Member libraries are provided customized online catalog services, digital collections storage, internet and telecommunications services, email and Google Apps accounts for library staff, access to SirsiDynix software, and staff training.

Approximately 70 percent of funding for SAILS comes from dues from member libraries, with the remaining portion coming from government subsidies and grants. In fiscal year 2017, the network's 463,000 patrons checked out almost 3.6 million items, worth an estimated $44 million. Deliveries of materials between member libraries and other library networks in Massachusetts through an interlibrary loan program are made by the Massachusetts Library System, which has offices in Northampton and Marlborough. The network uses SirsiDynix integrated library system (ILS) for staff function workflows: acquisitions, cataloging, circulation, ILL, and serials as well as for their patron's Online Public Access Catalog (OPAC). The libraries provide access to reference databases, digital libraries, access to free music online, museum passes, genealogy, workshops, and other free services that vary from each location. In 2018, the network introduced automatic renewals on most items.

Member libraries

Public libraries 

 Acushnet Public Library
 Guildford H. Hathaway Public Library (Assonet)
 Attleboro Public Library
 Berkley Public Library (Massachusetts)
 Bridgewater Public Library
 Carver Public Library
 Dartmouth - North Dartmouth Library
 Dartmouth - Southworth Library
 Dighton Public Library
 East Bridgewater Public Library
 James White Memorial Library (East Freetown)
 Ames Free Library (Easton)
 The Millicent Library (Fairhaven)
 Fall River Main
 Charlton Library of Fall River History
 Boyden Library (Foxboro)
 Holmes Public Library (Halifax)
 Hanson Public Library
 Lakeville Public Library
 Mansfield Public Library
 Elizabeth Taber Library (Marion)
 Mattapoisett Free Public Library
 Middleborough Public Library
 New Bedford Bookmobile
 Casa da Saudade Library (New Bedford)
 Howland-Green Library (New Bedford)
 Lawler Library (New Bedford)
 New Bedford Main Library
 Wilks Library (New Bedford)
 Norfolk Public Library
 Richards Memorial Library (North Attleboro)
 Norton Public Library
 Pembroke Public Library
 Plainville Public Library
 Plympton Public Library
 Raynham Public Library
 Blanding Public Library (Rehoboth)
 Joseph H. Plumb Memorial Library (Rochester, Massachusetts)
 SAILS Headquarters
 Seekonk Public Library
 Somerset Public Library
 Swansea Public Library
 Taunton Public Library
 Spinney Memorial Branch Library (Wareham
 Wareham Free Library
 West Bridgewater Public Library
 Westport Free Public Library
 Fiske Public Library (Wrentham)

Academic libraries 

 Apponequet Regional High School (Freetown/Lakeville)
 Attleboro High School
 Beckwith Middle School (Rehoboth)
 Dighton Elementary School
 Dighton Middle School
 Dighton-Rehoboth Regional High School (Dighton)
 B.M.C. Durfee High School (Fall River)
 East Bridgewater Central School
 East Bridgewater High School
 John J. Ahern Middle School (Foxborough)
 Foxborough High School
 American Bureau of Shipping Information Commons (Massachusetts Maritime Academy)
 New Bedford High School
 Freeman Kennedy School (Norfolk)
 H. Olive Day School (Norfolk)
 Palmer River Elementary School (Rehoboth)
 George R. Martin Elementary School (Seekonk)
 Dr. Kevin M. Hurley Middle School (Seekonk)
 Mildred H. Aitken Elementary School (Seekonk)
 Seekonk High School
 Somerset Berkley Regional High School
 Southeastern Regional School District
 Delaney Elementary School  (Wrentham)
 Roderick Elementary School  (Wrentham)

See also
 Cape Libraries Automated Materials Sharing (CLAMS)
 CW MARS (Central/Western Massachusetts Automated Resource Sharing)
 Merrimack Valley Library Consortium (MVLC)
 Minuteman Library Network (MLN)
 North of Boston Library Exchange (NOBLE)
 Old Colony Library Network (OCLN)

References 

Library consortia in Massachusetts
1995 establishments in Massachusetts